The 2017–18 Delaware Fightin' Blue Hens women's basketball team represents the University of Delaware during the 2017–18 NCAA Division I women's basketball season. The Fightin' Blue Hens, led by first year head coach Natasha Adair, play their home games at the Bob Carpenter Center and were members of the Colonial Athletic Association (CAA). They finished the season 19–13, 11–7 CAA play to finish in fourth place. They advanced to the semifinals of the CAA women's tournament where they lost to Drexel. They received an at-large to the Women's National Invitation Tournament where they lost in the first round to Georgetown.

Roster

Schedule

|-
!colspan=9 style=| Non-conference regular season

|-
!colspan=9 style=| CAA regular season

|-
!colspan=9 style=| CAA Women's Tournament

|-
!colspan=9 style=| WNIT

See also
2017–18 Delaware Fightin' Blue Hens men's basketball team

References

External links

Delaware Fightin' Blue Hens women's basketball seasons
Delaware
Delaware Fightin' Blue Hens women's basketball
Delaware Fightin' Blue Hens women's basketball
Delaware